The Later Life Workplace Index (LLWI) serves as a measurement instrument for age-inclusive organizational practices and working conditions for the successful employment of age-diverse workforces. Especially in the light of demographic change and shortages of skilled workers, the employment of older workers gains importance. The index summarizes practices and working conditions that are beneficial for an older workforce by fostering their health, motivation, and performance. A corresponding questionnaire containing 80 items can be used to evaluate organizational practices on nine domains.

The index was developed at the chair of Professor Dr. Jürgen Deller at Leuphana University of Lüneburg. It emerged from a cooperation with the German Federal Institute for Occupational Safety and Health, the Demographie Netzwerk e.V., and the Goinger Kreis e.V.

Objectives 
The LLWI aims to identify organizational factors for the successful employment of older workers and make them measurable. Research regarding the index can help to understand the relative importance of individual organizational practices for the success and sustainability of the employment of older workers. Organizations are able to easily assess their working conditions for older workers and to identify areas for improvement. Hence the LLWI contributes to coping with demographic change and its consequences from an organizational perspective.

Dimensions 
The index covers the following nine domains:

 Organizational climate
 Leadership
 Work design
 Health management
 Individual development
 Knowledge management
 Transition to retirement
 Continued employment
 Health and retirement coverage

Development 
The LLWI is based on extensive qualitative as well as quantitative research. Within the first development phase, the model was derived from expert interviews in Germany and business analyses in the U.S. to form the Silver Work Index (SWI).  Subsequently, the index was operationalized into a questionnaire and its reliability as well as validity were checked in several studies in Germany. In cooperation with international scientists, the LLWI is currently being translated into other languages. An English-language version of the LLWI was published in 2021. Over the course of the operationalization and internationalization, the former Silver Work Index was renamed Later Life Workplace Index.

The LLWI can be considered as an extension of the Active Ageing Index (AAI), which is a joint project of the UNECE Population Unit, the European Commission Directorate General for Employment, Social Affairs and Inclusion as well as the European Centre for Social Welfare Policy and Research. The AAI measures the extent to which older people live independently and participate in economic as well as social activities to identify untapped potential for actively ageing societies. This macro level analysis is being complemented on organizational meso level by the LLWI.

References

Further reading 

 Finsel, J. S., Wöhrmann, A. M., Wang, M., Wilckens, M. R., & Deller, J. (2023). Later Life Workplace Index: Validation of an English version. Work, Aging and Retirement, 9(1), 71-94. https://doi.org/10.1093/workar/waab029 
Wilckens, M., Wöhrmann, A. M., Deller, J. & Wang, M. (2021). Organizational practices for the aging workforce: Development and validation of the Later Life Workplace Index (LLWI). Work, Aging and Retirement, 7(4), 352–386. https://doi.org/10.1093/workar/waaa012 
Wilckens, M. R., Wöhrmann, A. M., Adams, C., Deller, J., & Finkelstein, R. (2020). Integrating the German and US perspective on organizational practices for later life work: The Later Life Work Index. In S. J. Czaja, J. Sharit, & J. B. James (Eds.), Current and emerging trends in aging and work (pp. 59-79). Cham, Switzerland: Springer. 
 Wöhrmann, A. M., Deller, J., & Pundt, L. (2018). Complementing AAI at the meso level: The Silver Work Index. In A. Zaidi, S. Harper, K. Howse, G. Lamura, & J. Perek-Białas (Eds.), Building evidence for active ageing policies: Active Ageing Index and its potential (pp. 75–94). London: Palgrave MacMillan.

External links 

 Later Life Workplace Index

Organizational studies

Human resource management
Measurement
Demographics